Im Dong-jin (born April 27, 1944) is a South Korean actor.

He known for his supporting roles in historical television dramas Dae Jo-yeong and The Jingbirok: A Memoir of Imjin War.

References 

Living people
1944 births